Big Lots Stores, Inc. (stylized as Big Lots!) is an American furniture and home decor retailer headquartered in Columbus, Ohio, United States.

History
The Big Lots chain traces its history back to 1967 when Consolidated Stores Corporation was formed in Ohio by Sol Shenk. In 1982, Consolidated Stores Corp. opened its first closeout store, called Odd Lots, in Columbus, Ohio. In 1983, drug store chain Revco bought New Jersey closeout retailer Odd Lot Trading Co. As Consolidated's Odd Lots stores expanded from Columbus, Revco took issue with the fact that another closeout retailer was operating a chain with national aspirations that had a similar name as the Revco-owned subsidiary. Consolidated Stores Corp. agreed to limit their use of the Odd Lots name to stores located within a certain radius of Columbus. Beyond the radius, Consolidated began opening stores under the Big & Small Lots name. Eventually, all Odd Lots stores were rebranded as Big Lots. In 1985, Consolidated Stores Corp. began trading as a separate public company on the American Stock Exchange. In 1986, Consolidated Stores Corp. switched to the New York Stock Exchange, trading under the symbol CNS.

Consolidated Stores Corp. was an investor in the DeLorean Motor Company, which declared bankruptcy in 1982. Consolidated took possession of approximately 100 DeLorean models, then still at the factory in Northern Ireland, when the U.S. importer was unable to import them. This unusual excess inventory acquisition is commemorated on the Big Lots website's "Closeout Museum" page.

In 1994, Consolidated Stores Corp. acquired Toy Liquidators, adding 82 stores in 38 states. Looking to expand further into the toy business, Consolidated Stores Corp. purchased KB Toys from Melville Corporation in 1996; ironically, shortly afterward Melville purchased Revco and folded it into the CVS Pharmacy chain on its way to eventually becoming CVS Health, making the "Odd Lots" dispute moot.

In 1997, Big Lots Inc. bought out 'MacFrugals' (Pic 'N' Save) stores for $995 million in stock, eventually converting them to the Big Lots brand.

In 2000, Consolidated Stores Corp. sold the KB Toys and Toy Liquidators lines to private equity shops. A year later, Consolidated Stores Corp. changed its name to Big Lots, Inc. and its ticker symbol from CNS to BLI.

In the later part of 2005, Big Lots closed 170 stores, including all free-standing Big Lots Furniture specialty stores.

On August 3, 2006, Big Lots announced that it would change its New York Stock Exchange ticker symbol from BLI to BIG, beginning with trading activity on August 18, 2006.

Big Lots Wholesale
Big Lots operated a wholesale division which provided merchandise in bulk. Big Lots closed its wholesale division at the end of the 2013 fiscal year. The Columbus-based closeout retailer had conducted wholesale operations through Big Lots Wholesale, Consolidated International and Wisconsin Toy for more than 34 years.

Big Lots Canada

On July 19, 2011, Big Lots announced that it had purchased Liquidation World Inc., a Canadian closeout retailer with 89 locations. The cost of the acquisition was $20 million in cash and the assumption of certain liabilities. This represents Big Lots first retail venture outside of the US. The first Big Lots location in Canada opened in April 2013 in Orillia, Ontario, followed by Burlington, Niagara Falls, St. Catharines, and Thunder Bay (all in Ontario as well). Big Lots exited the Canadian marketplace in 2014, citing poor sales.

See also
 List of S&P 400 companies

References

External links
 
 
 Official website
 Big Lots SEC Filings

Companies listed on the New York Stock Exchange
Companies based in the Columbus, Ohio metropolitan area
American companies established in 1967
Retail companies established in 1967
Discount stores of the United States
Toy retailers of the United States
Variety stores
1967 establishments in Ohio
1980s initial public offerings